Otsego Lake Township is a civil township of Otsego County in the U.S. state of Michigan. The population was 2,847 at the 2010 census. 

The township takes its name from Otsego Lake, in which the southern half is within the township. Otsego Lake State Park is located in the township on the southeast shore of the lake.

Communities
It was settled as a small resort community, and its name comes from both its shoreline on Otsego Lake and the abundant Arbutus in the nearby woods.
It is centered along the junction of county highways C-38 and F-38 just east of Interstate 75. The community was settled along the Jackson, Lansing and Saginaw Railroad in 1872 and was named after the lake. A post office opened on July 23, 1873 and operated until February 15, 1932.
The community began as a sawmill settlement at the northern end of Bradford Lake in 1873. It was given a railroad station by 1876. The community received a post office named Bradford Lake on July 18, 1876 and was renamed to Waters on December 21, 1885. The name was chosen for the many lakes in the surrounding area. The post office remains in operation and uses the 49797 ZIP Code, which serves primarily for post office box services to Gaylord.

Geography

Demographics
As of the census of 2000, there were 2,532 people, 1,070 households, and 786 families residing in the township. The racial makeup of the township was 98.30% White, 0.12% African American, 0.36% Native American, 0.04% from other races, and 1.18% from two or more races. Hispanic or Latino of any race were 0.32% of the population.

There were 1,070 households, out of which 26.4% had children under the age of 18 living with them, 64.6% were married couples living together, 5.2% had a female householder with no husband present, and 26.5% were non-families. 22.1% of all households were made up of individuals, and 9.6% had someone living alone who was 65 years of age or older.  The average household size was 2.37 and the average family size was 2.74.

In the township the population was spread out, with 22.3% under the age of 18, 4.4% from 18 to 24, 25.0% from 25 to 44, 27.8% from 45 to 64, and 20.5% who were 65 years of age or older.  The median age was 44 years. For every 100 females, there were 107.0 males.  For every 100 females age 18 and over, there were 101.1 males.

The median income for a household in the township was $44,351, and the median income for a family was $50,403. Males had a median income of $36,927 versus $24,375 for females. The per capita income for the township was $23,350.  About 4.5% of families and 6.5% of the population were below the poverty line, including 10.4% of those under age 18 and 2.7% of those age 65 or over.

Images

References

Sources

External links
Otsego Lake Township official website

Townships in Otsego County, Michigan
Townships in Michigan